Precomputed Radiance Transfer (PRT) is a computer graphics technique used to render a scene in real time with complex light interactions being precomputed to save time.  Radiosity methods can be used to determine the diffuse lighting of the scene, however PRT offers a method to dynamically change the lighting environment.

In essence, PRT computes the illumination of a point as a linear combination of incident irradiance.  An efficient method must be used to encode this data, such as spherical harmonics.

When spherical harmonics are used to approximate the light transport function, only low-frequency effects can be handled with a reasonable number of parameters.  Ren Ng extended this work to handle higher frequency shadows by replacing spherical harmonics with non-linear wavelets.

Teemu Mäki-Patola gives a clear introduction to the topic based on the work of Peter-Pike Sloan et al. At SIGGRAPH 2005, a detailed course on PRT was given.

References

Peter-Pike Sloan, Jan Kautz, and John Snyder. "Precomputed Radiance Transfer for Real-time rendering in Dynamic, Low-Frequency Lighting Environments". ACM Transactions on Graphics, Proceedings of the 29th Annual Conference on Computer Graphics and Interactive Techniques (SIGGRAPH), pp. 527-536. New York, NY: ACM Press, 2002. 
NG, R., RAMAMOORTHI, R., AND HANRAHAN, P. 2003. All-Frequency Shadows Using Non-Linear Wavelet Lighting Approximation.  ACM Transactions on Graphics 22, 3, 376–381. 

3D computer graphics